The Shiming, also known as the Yìyǎ (逸雅; I-ya; Lost Erya), is a Chinese dictionary that employed phonological glosses, and "is believed to date from c. 200 [CE]".

This dictionary is linguistically invaluable because it records the pronunciation of an Eastern Han Chinese dialect. Sinologists have used their data to approximate the dates of phonological changes, such as the loss of consonant clusters which took place between Old Chinese and Middle Chinese.

Format
The 1,502 definitions attempt to establish semantic connections based upon puns between the word being defined and the word defining it, which is often followed with an explanation. For instance (chapter 12: 愛哀也愛乃思念之也), "Love (ài 愛 "love; like; be fond of") is sorrow (āi "哀 sorrow; grief; lament"). If you love, then you remember fondly." The Chinese call these paronomastic glosses yīnxùn (音訓; yin-hsün; "sound teaching"), meaning "to use the pronunciation of a word to explain its meaning." This semantic association of like-sounding words goes back to the "Rectification of Names" (zhèngmíng 正名, discussed under Confucianism), which hypothesized a connection between names and reality. The Shiming preface explains this ancient Chinese theory of language.
In the correspondence of name with reality, there is in each instance that which is right and proper. The common people use names every day, but they do not know the reasons why names are what they are. Therefore I have chosen to record names for heaven and earth, yin and yang, the four seasons, states, cities, vehicles, clothing and mourning ceremonies, up to and including the vessels commonly used by the people, and have discussed these terms intending to explain their origin.

Work authorship and internal organization
The earliest reference to the Shiming is a criticism in the late 3rd century Records of Three Kingdoms biography of Wei Zhao (韋昭; 204–273); while in prison, Wei wrote a supplement to Liu Xi's Shiming because it lacked information on official titles. The next reference is in the mid 5th century Hòu Hàn Shū biography of Liu Zhen, which notes that he wrote an otherwise unknown Shiming in 30 chapters (篇). The received text has 8 fascicles/volumes (卷) and 27 sections that the Shiming preface, written in Liu Xi's name, calls 27 chapters (篇). Bibliographies in official histories simply listed the Shiming as having eight fascicles without mentioning the number of chapters. The Ming dynasty scholar Zheng Mingxuan (鄭明選; flourished during Wanli era 1572–1620) questioned the difference in chapters and doubted the book's authenticity. The Qing dynasty commentator Bi Yuan (畢沅; 1730–1797), who published the 1789 Shiming shuzheng (釋名疏證; "Exegetical evidence for Shiming") critical edition, believed that the work was begun by Liu Zhen and completed by Liu Xi who added his preface. Another Qing scholar Qian Daxin (錢大昕; 1728–1804) concurred that Liu Xi was the author based upon studies of his students' biographies. Based on internal evidence, Bodman concludes, "It is not impossible that Liu Zhen did compose such a work and that Liu Xi might have used some of its material in his work, but the chance of this having happened is very small." The date of the Shiming is almost as controversial as its author. However, it is undisputed that Liu Xi lived at the end of the Eastern Han dynasty and was a refugee (who fled to Jiaozhou, present-day Hanoi) from the turmoil between the Yellow Turban Rebellion in 184 and the dynastic collapse in 220 CE.

Contents

From this table of contents, the Shiming clearly followed the Eryas organization into semantically arranged chapters and all their titles begin with the word shì ("explain; explaining").

See also
Xiao Erya
Guangya
Piya

References
Footnotes

Further reading

External links
Shiming 釋名, Chinaknowledge
釋名 Shiming text (in Chinese)
Chinese Text Project – 釋名 (Chinese)

Chinese classic texts
Chinese dictionaries